In Greek mythology, Autolycus (Ancient Greek: Αὐτόλυκος Autolykos, "the wolf itself") was a Triccan prince as son of King Deimachus of Thessaly and brother of Demoleon (Deileon), Phlogius and sometimes, Phronius.

Autolycus, together with his brothers, joined Heracles in his expedition against the Amazons. But after having gone astray, the three brothers dwelt at Sinope, until they joined the expedition of the Argonauts. Autolycus was subsequently regarded as the founder of Sinope, where he was worshipped as a god and had an oracle. After the conquest of Sinope by the Romans, his statue was carried from there by Lucullus to Rome. 

Hyginus confounded the brothers Autolycus, Phronius, Demoleon and Phlogius with the sons of Phrixus and Chalciope: Argus, Melas, Phrontides, and Cylindrus. These were also rescued by the Argonauts on the island of Dia.

Notes

References
Apollonius Rhodius, Argonautica translated by Robert Cooper Seaton (1853-1915), R. C. Loeb Classical Library Volume 001. London, William Heinemann Ltd, 1912. Online version at the Topos Text Project.
Apollonius Rhodius, Argonautica. George W. Mooney. London. Longmans, Green. 1912. Greek text available at the Perseus Digital Library.
Gaius Julius Hyginus, Fabulae from The Myths of Hyginus translated and edited by Mary Grant. University of Kansas Publications in Humanistic Studies. Online version at the Topos Text Project.
Gaius Valerius Flaccus, Argonautica translated by Mozley, J H. Loeb Classical Library Volume 286. Cambridge, MA, Harvard University Press; London, William Heinemann Ltd. 1928. Online version at theio.com.
Gaius Valerius Flaccus, Argonauticon. Otto Kramer. Leipzig. Teubner. 1913. Latin text available at the Perseus Digital Library.
Strabo, The Geography of Strabo. Edition by H.L. Jones. Cambridge, Mass.: Harvard University Press; London: William Heinemann, Ltd. 1924. Online version at the Perseus Digital Library.
Strabo, Geographica edited by A. Meineke. Leipzig: Teubner. 1877. Greek text available at the Perseus Digital Library.

Argonauts
Thessalian mythology